Ringo Point is an unincorporated community in Adair County, in the U.S. state of Missouri.

History
A post office called Ringo's Point was established in 1857, and remained in operation until 1886. The community was named after Joseph Ringo, an early settler.

References

Unincorporated communities in Adair County, Missouri
1857 establishments in Missouri
Unincorporated communities in Missouri